José Luis Gavidia Arrascue (born October 14, 1958) is a retired counter admiral of the Peruvian Navy who served as the minister of Defense of Peru from February to August 2022.

References

1958 births
Living people
21st-century Peruvian politicians
Defense ministers of Peru